Patras Province was a province covering the western part of the Achaea prefecture, Greece. Its largest city and seat of administration was Patras. Its territory corresponded with that of the current municipalities Patras, Erymanthos and West Achaea, and the municipal unit Erineos. It was abolished in 2006.

Subdivisions
The Patras province was subdivided into the following municipalities and communities (situation after the 1997 Kapodistrias reform):
Dymi
Erineos
Farres
Kalentzi (community)
Larissos
Leontio
Messatida
Movri
Olenia
Paralia
Patras
Rio
Tritaia
Vrachnaiika

References

Achaea
Provinces of Greece
History of Patras
Politics of Patras